Peter Albach (born 26 July 1956 in Sömmerda, Bezirk Erfurt) is a German politician and member of the CDU. From 2005 to 2009 he was a member of the Bundestag of Germany. He did not run for the federal elections in 2009. Since 1990, he has uninterruptedly served as the mayor of Weißensee, Thuringia.

References

1956 births
Living people
People from Sömmerda
People from Bezirk Erfurt
German Lutherans
Members of the Bundestag for Thuringia
Mayors of places in Thuringia
Members of the Bundestag 2005–2009
Members of the Bundestag for the Christian Democratic Union of Germany